The 2006 Wyre Forest District Council election took place on 4 May 2006 to elect members of Wyre Forest District Council in Worcestershire, England. One third of the council was up for election and the council stayed under no overall control.

After the election, the composition of the council was:
Conservative 18
Health Concern 9
Liberal 7
Labour 4
Liberal Democrats 2
Independent 2

Campaign
Before the 2006 election the Conservatives had 18 seats on the council, both Health Concern and the Liberals had 8 seats, Labour had 4 seats and both the Liberal Democrats and independents had 2 seats. Since the last election in 2004 one Conservative councillor, Louise Edginton, had left the party to become an independent, after not being selected as a candidate for the 2005 Worcestershire County Council election.

14 seats were contested in the election with the Conservatives defending 7, Health Concern 4 and the Liberals 3. 50 candidates, including the leader of the council Stephen Clee, stood in the election with the Conservatives hoping to take overall control.

Local health services continued to be the major issue in the campaign after the local NHS trust announced in April 2006 that it would have to cut 720 jobs in order to save money. Other issues in the election included council tax, with the Conservatives saying they had reduced its burden since they began running the council in 2004, and a lack of affordable housing which Labour wanted to address.

Election result
There was a net change of only one seat with Health Concern moving to 9 seats at the expense of the Liberals. Health Concern's gain from the Liberals came in Broadwaters ward where the sitting Liberal councillor, Amanda Poole, stood down at the election. Health Concern saw the election results as being excellent, with the health issue in the lead up to the election seen as having helped the party.

As a result, the Conservatives failed to take the majority they had been aiming for with the Conservative leader of the council, Stephen Clee, disappointed at failing to make gains but pleased that they remained the largest party. The Labour leader on the council, Jamie Shaw, described the results as "very bad indeed" after the party failed to win any seats. Overall voter turnout at the election was 37.5%.

Ward results

References

2006 English local elections
2006
2000s in Worcestershire